San Javier Airport may refer to:

 Murcia–San Javier Airport in San Javier, Spain
 San Javier Airport (Bolivia) near San Javier, Santa Cruz, Bolivia
 San Javier Las Mercedes Airport near San Javier, Maule, Chile
 San Javier Airport (Chile) near San Javier, Maule, Chile
 San Javier Santa María de Migre Airport near San Javier, Maule, Chile